Ernesto Emilio Villegas Poljak is a journalist, politician, and writer from Venezuela.

Biography 
Ernesto Villegas was born in Caracas in 1970. He is the youngest of eight children, two of them, Mario and Vladimir, Alice, Clara, Esperanza, Tatiana and Asia.

He is the son of Cruz Villegas, head union communist, confined to the Amazon jungle during the dictatorship of Marcos Pérez Jiménez, and former president of the United Workers of Venezuela (CUTV) and vice president of the World Federation of Trade Unions. His mother, Maja Poljak was Jewish and a Communist social activist and photographer born in Zagreb, Croatia, formerly Yugoslavia.

Villegas graduated as a journalist from Central University of Venezuela. He had worked in media such as newspapers Economía Hoy, El Nuevo País, El Universal and Quinto Día, En Confianza, Despertó Venezuela and Toda Venezuela of Venezolana de Televisión. He was the editor of the newspaper Ciudad Caracas.

He was the Minister of Popular Power for Communication and Information from October 2012 until August 2013. Later, he was appointed as Minister of State for the Revolutionary Transformation of Greater Caracas since December 2013. From October 2014 to May 2015, he was the Head of Government for the Venezuelan Capital District.

Controversy

Sanctions 

In November 2017, Ernesto Villegas was sanctioned by the United States Office of Foreign Assets Control after the 2017 Venezuelan Constituent Assembly election.

On 29 March 2018, Villegas was sanctioned by the Panamanian government for his alleged involvement with "money laundering, financing of terrorism and financing the proliferation of weapons of mass destruction".

See also
Bolivarian propaganda
The Commission of Propaganda, Agitation and Communication of the PSUV

References

Living people
Politicians from Caracas
United Socialist Party of Venezuela politicians
Venezuelan people of Croatian-Jewish descent
1970 births
People of the Crisis in Venezuela